Stolen Recordings is a British independent record label founded by two musicians, Paul Jones and Mérida Sussex and one artist, Rachael Robb, and is based in Tottenham, London. Stolen's first release was in May 2005. In 2009 they founded a publishing company, in association with Beggars Music, called "Stolen Publishing". Stolen's releases include albums by Thomas Cohen, Bo Ningen, East India Youth, Pete and The Pirates, and Serafina Steer.

Stolen Recordings won the Award for "Best Small Label" at the inaugural AIM Awards on 10 November 2011.

Artists
 Thomas Cohen
 Bo Ningen
 East India Youth
 Pete And The Pirates
 JEFF The Brotherhood
 Serafina Steer
 Let's Wrestle
 Screaming Tea Party
 Race Horses 
 Hot Silk Pockets
 Mathew Sawyer and the Ghosts

Catalogue

 Thomas Cohen ‘Bloom Forever’ (SR083, LP / CD / DL) 2016
 Thomas Cohen,"Bloom Forever" / "Honeymoon" (SR082, 12” / DL) 2016
 East India Youth, 20,000 LEAGUES UNDER THE SEA (SR081, CD / DL) 2014
 Bo Ningen & Savages, Words to the Blind (POPNSR01, LP / CD / DL) 2014
 Bo Ningen, III (SR077, LP / CD / DL) 2014
 East India Youth, "HINTERLAND" (SR076, 12” / DL) 2014
 East India Youth, TOTAL STRIFE FOREVER (SR073, LP / CD / DL) 2014 
 East India Youth, "DRIPPING DOWN" (SR074, 10” / DL) 2013
 Serafina Steer, Disco Compilation (SR068, 7” / DL) 2013
 Serafina Steer, The Moths Are Real (SR063, LP / CD / DL) 2013
 Bo Ningen, Line The Wall (SR060, LP / CD / DL) 2012
 Race Horses, Furniture (SR058, LP / CD / DL) 2012
 Race Horses, "My Year Abroad" (SR057, 7” / DL) 2012
 Bo Ningen, "Live at St. Leonard’s Church" (SR055, 10” / DL) 2011
 My Sad Captains, Fight Less Win More (SR052, CD / DL) 2011
 Bo Ningen, "Henkan" (SR051, 7” / DL) 2011
 Jeff The Brotherhood, We Are The Champions (SR050, CD / DL) 2011
 Various Artists, Stolen 6 (SR048, CD)  2011
 Pete And The Pirates, One Thousand Pictures (SR046, LP / CD / DL) 2011
 Jeff The Brotherherhood, Heavy Days (SR043, CD / DL) 2011
 Bo Ningen, Bo Ningen (SR042, CD / DL) 2010
 Serafina Steer, Bloody Hell (SR040, CD / DL) 2010
 The European, In a Very Real Sense Now  (SR036, LP / DL) 2010
 Tap Tap, On My Way (SR032, CD / DL) 2009
 Let’s Wrestle, In the Court of Wrestling Let’s (SR028X, CD / DL) 2009
 My Sad Captains, Here and Elsewhere (SR027X, CD / DL) 2009
 Artefacts For Space Travel ‘Power of the Brain’ (SR024X, CD / DL) 2008
 Screaming Tea Party ‘Golden Blue’ (SR023X, CD / DL) 2008
 Hot Silk Pockets ‘Panda Eyes’ (SR022X, CD / DL) 2008
 Let’s Wrestle ‘Let’s Wrestle / I’m In Fighting Mode’ (SR020, 7” / DL) 2008
 Pete And The Pirates ‘She Doesn’t Belong To Me’ (SR019vinyl, 7” / DL) 2008
 Pete And The Pirates ‘Mr Understanding’ (SR017X, 7” / CD / DL) 2008
 Let’s Wrestle ‘In Loving Memory Of’ (SR016, CD / DL) 2008
 Pete And The Pirates ‘Little Death’ (SR011, LP / CD / DL) 2008
 Pete And The Pirates ‘Knots’ (SR0107inch, 7” / DL) 2007
 Matthew Sawyer and the Ghosts ‘Blue Birds Blood’ (SR009, CD / DL) 2007
 Various Artists ‘Stolen Compilation’ (SR008CD, CD / DL) 2007
 Pete And The Pirates ‘Come On Feet’ (SR007, 7” / DL) 2007
 Tap Tap ‘Lanzafame’ (SR006, CD / DL) 2006
 Screaming Tea Party ‘Death Egg’ (SR005, 10” / DL) 2007
 Pete & The Pirates ‘Wait Stop Begin’ (SR004, CD / DL) 2006
 Various Artists ‘Stolen Compilation’ (SR003, CD / DL) 2006
 Pete & The Pirates ‘Get Even’ (SR002, CD / DL) 2005
 Candy ‘Last Night’ (SR001, CD / DL) 2005

See also 
 List of record labels
 List of independent UK record labels

References

External links
Official Stolen Recordings website

British independent record labels
Indie rock record labels
Beggars Group